Gyrinopsis antiquus is an extinct species of fossil beetle in the family Gyrinidae, the only species in the genus Gyrinopsis.

References

Gyrinidae
Fossil taxa described in 1865